National Route 241 is a national highway of Japan connecting Teshikaga, Hokkaidō and Obihiro, Hokkaidō in Japan, with a total length of 162.5 km (100.97 mi).

References

National highways in Japan
Roads in Hokkaido